Cyclocheilichthys lagleri is a species of cyprinid fish in the genus Cyclocheilichthys, it is found in the upper Chao Phraya and lower Mekong basins in south-east Asia.

Footnotes 

 

Fish described in 1989
Fish of Thailand
Cyprinid fish of Asia
lagleri